Lucija Šerbedžija (born 8 June 1973) is a Croatian theatre and film actress and model, a daughter of actor, Rade, and a sister of film director, Danilo Šerbedžija. She is probably best known in the English-speaking world for her role in The Saint as a Russian prostitute, in which her father also starred.

She is a winner of two Golden Arena awards for Best Actress; in 1999 (Madonna) and 2001 (for Slow Surrender).

Filmography
Mondo Bobo (1997)
The Saint (1997)
Madonna (1999)
Celestial Body (2001)
Slow Surrender (2001)
Remake (2003)
Infection (2003)
72 Days (2010)

References

External links
 

1973 births
Actresses from Zagreb
Croatian film actresses
Croatian television actresses
Living people
Golden Arena winners
20th-century Croatian actresses
21st-century Croatian actresses
Croatian people of Serbian descent